The Allegory of Vice is an oil on canvas painting by Correggio dating to around 1531 and measuring 149 by 88 cm.

Provenance 
This picture and the Allegory of Virtue were painted as a pair for the studiolo of Isabella d'Este, with Vice probably the second of the two to be completed. This hypothesis is since only one (possibly non-autograph) sketch survives for Vice, unlike Virtue, for which several preparatory studies survive, along with a near-complete under-drawing – this suggests Correggio had become more proficient after the difficult gestation of Virtue.

Influenced by the Laocoon (as is Correggio's treatment of Saint Roch in his San Sebastiano Madonna and Four Saints), the central male figure is sometimes identified as a personification of Vice but sometimes as Silenus (possibly from Virgil's Eclogues 6, where a sleeping Silenus is tied up by the shepherds Chromi and Marsillo and forced to sing by them and the nymph Egle) or Vulcan. It was even misidentified as Apollo and Marsyas by the writer of the Gonzaga collection inventory of 1542. This misunderstanding may have contributed to an Apollo and Marsyas (actually by the studio or circle of Bronzino) being historically misattributed to Correggio. The putto in the foreground is influenced by Raphael's putti in the Sistine Chapel.

In 1542, after Isabella's death, they were both recorded as hanging on either side of the entrance door "in the Corte Vecchia near the grotto", with Vice on the left and Virtue on the right. After the contents of her studiolo were dispersed, it remained in Mantua at least until 1627, but the following year it was sold to Charles I of Great Britain. After his execution it was purchased by cardinal Mazarin in 1661 and later by the banker Everhard Jabach, who later sold it to Louis XIV in Paris, reuniting it with Virtue. They both now hang in the Louvre.

References

16th-century allegorical paintings
Allegorical paintings by Italian artists
Paintings by Correggio
1531 paintings
Paintings in the Louvre by Italian artists
Musical instruments in art
Silenus